Attorney General Hitchcock may refer to:

Henry Hitchcock (1792–1839), Attorney General of Alabama
Samuel Hitchcock (1755–1813), Attorney General of Vermont

See also
General Hitchcock (disambiguation)